Kalanadi is an unclassified Southern Dravidian language of India. It is most similar to Pathiya with which it shares 88% lexical similarity.

References

Dravidian languages